Kofleriaceae is an aerobic family of bacteria from the order of Myxococcales.

See also
 List of bacterial orders
 List of bacteria genera

References

Further reading 
 
 

 

Myxococcota